Reading City Football Club is a football club based in Reading, Berkshire, England.

History
The club was established in 2001 as Highmoor Ibis by a merger of Highmoor and Ibis, both of which were playing in the Reading Senior League, Highmoor in the Senior Division and Ibis in the Premier Division. Ibis had also previously played in the Chiltonian League. The new club took Highmoor's place in the Senior Division and were league champions in 2003–04 without losing a match. They won the Reading Senior Cup in 2005–06, beating Woodley Town 4–1 in the final at the Madjeski Stadium.

After finishing as runners-up in 2006–07 and 2008–09, Highmoor were champions again in 2010–11, earning promotion to Division One East of the Hellenic League. In their first season in Division One East they finished as runners-up and were promoted to the Premier Division. They were Premier Division runners-up in 2014–15. In June 2018 the club were renamed Reading City. At the end of the 2020–21 season the club were transferred to the Premier Division North of the Combined Counties League.

Ground
The club played at Scours Lane until 2011 when they were forced to leave to take promotion to the Hellenic League as the ground did not have a stand or floodlights. Instead, the club moved to the Palmer Park Stadium, a general use stadium including a 780-seat stand and an athletics track around the pitch. However, in 2016 the club returned to Scours Lane as the ground had been upgraded to the required standards. The ground was also renamed the Rivermoor Stadium.

Honours
Reading League
Senior Division champions 2003–04, 2010–11
Reading Senior Cup
Winners 2006–07

Records
Best FA Cup performance: First qualifying round, 2013–14
Best FA Vase performance: First round, 2013–14, 2014–15, 2015–16, 2016–17

See also
Reading City F.C. players
Reading City F.C. managers

References

External links
Official website

 
Football clubs in England
Football clubs in Reading
Football clubs in Berkshire
Association football clubs established in 2001
2001 establishments in England
Thames Valley Premier Football League
Hellenic Football League
Combined Counties Football League